Robert K. Bishop (1945-1991) was a bondage artist best known for his images of restrained and gagged women published by the House of Milan, for which he also worked as production manager. 

His main work period was during the 1970s and early 1980s. His work was largely monochrome, rendered using pencil, ink and airbrush. Disputes over Harmony Productions' "love bondage" ethos led to his leaving Harmony Productions for House of Milan. He also worked for Centurian Publications and produced cover illustrations for numerous bondage novels by F. E. Campbell. He also both wrote and illustrated a series of stories describing the misadventures of the character "Fanni Hall".

He also made a small number of works depicting men being dominated by women.

It has been suggested that Bishop also published under the pseudonym Ashely, but this is disputed.

Jeff Gord cited Bishop's work as an inspiration for his own work.

Robert Bishop was born in Michigan, USA in 1945. He studied art in Michigan Art School. Robert Bishop died by suicide in 1991, at the age of 46.

Bibliography 
 The First Erotic Art of Bishop, Van Nuys: Centurian / London Enterprises, 1980, 62pp.
 Bishop: The Art of Bondage #1, London Enterprises, Van Nuys, 1992
 Bishop: The Art of Bondage #2, London Enterprises, Van Nuys, 1993, 47pp.
 Bondage Katalog 1, 192pp.
 Bondage Katalog 2, 192pp.
 Bondage Katalog 3, 192pp.

References 

Fetish artists
American artists
1945 births
1991 deaths
Bondage artists